St. Joseph's School in Khorabar, Gorakhpur. Uttar Pradesh is an English-medium school, established and governed by the Roman Catholic Diocese of Gorakhpur. Founded in 1997, it offers classes from lower kindergarten to Class XII. It is affiliated to the Council for the Indian School Certificate Examinations.

References

Catholic schools in India
Private schools in Uttar Pradesh
Christian schools in Uttar Pradesh
Gorakhpur district
Educational institutions established in 1997
1997 establishments in Uttar Pradesh